The Houston Journal of International Law is a triannual student-edited law journal published by the University of Houston Law Center. It ranks among the top 28% of all international law journals and the top 28% of all law journals published worldwide. It was established in 1978.

References

External links

American law journals
International law journals
University of Houston
Publications established in 1978
Triannual journals
English-language journals